Dactylopisthoides is a monotypic genus of Asian dwarf spiders containing the single species, Dactylopisthoides hyperboreus. It was first described by K. Y. Eskov in 1990, and has only been found in Russia.

See also
 List of Linyphiidae species

References

Linyphiidae
Monotypic Araneomorphae genera
Spiders of Russia